Isabelle Mir (born 2 March 1949) is a French former Alpine skier. At the 1968 Olympics in Grenoble Mir was silver medalist in the downhill. She received a silver medal at the FIS Alpine World Ski Championships 1970.

World cup
Se won the women's downhill at the 1968 Alpine Skiing World Cup and at the 1970 Alpine Skiing World Cup, while she finished second at the 1967 Alpine Skiing World Cup and at the 1969 Alpine Skiing World Cup. She was second overall at the 1968 Alpine Skiing World Cup.

References

External links
 
 
 

1949 births
Living people
French female alpine skiers
Olympic alpine skiers of France
Alpine skiers at the 1968 Winter Olympics
Alpine skiers at the 1972 Winter Olympics
Olympic silver medalists for France
Olympic medalists in alpine skiing
FIS Alpine Ski World Cup champions
Medalists at the 1968 Winter Olympics